Idaea or Idaia (Ancient Greek: Ἰδαία) is the name of several figures in Greek mythology, it means "she who comes from Ida" or "she who lives on Ida", and is often associated with Mount Ida in Crete, and Mount Ida in the Troad.

Figures 
Those named Idaea include:

 Idaea, a nymph, who was the mother, by the river-god Scamander, of King Teucer.
 Idaea, the daughter of the Scythian king Dardanus, and wife of Phineus, who falsely accused her stepsons, leading to their imprisonment and torture.
Idaea was, according to Diodorus Siculus, the mother of the Kuretes, the armed dancers who guarded the infant Zeus in a cave on Cretan Mount Ida.
Idaea, a nymph who consorted with Zeus and became the mother of Cres, possible eponym of Crete. She may be the same with Idaea, daughter of Minos who mothered Asterion by Zeus also.

Etymology
The name is related with Mount Ida. In the Iliad (2.821 etc.), Ida means wooded hill, and recalls the mountain worship in the Minoan mother goddess religion. Three inscriptions in Linear A, which represents the Minoan language, bear just the name i-da-ma-te (AR Zf 1 and 2, and KY Za 2). The inscriptions may refer to the "mother goddess of Ida" (Ἰδαία μάτηρ).

Νotes

References
 Apollodorus, Apollodorus, The Library, with an English Translation by Sir James George Frazer, F.B.A., F.R.S. in 2 Volumes. Cambridge, MA, Harvard University Press; London, William Heinemann Ltd. 1921. Online version at the Perseus Digital Library.
 Clementine Recognitions, translated by Thomas Smith, in Ante-Nicene Christian Library: Translations of the Writings of the Fathers down to A.D. 325. Editied by Alexander Roberts, and James Donaldson, Vol III. Tatian, Theophilus, and The Clementine Recognitions. T. and T, Clark, Edinburgh 1867. Online version at Wikisource
 Diodorus Siculus, Diodorus Siculus: The Library of History. Translated by C. H. Oldfather. Twelve volumes. Loeb Classical Library. Cambridge, MA: Harvard University Press; London: William Heinemann, Ltd. 1989. Online version by Bill Thayer
 Grimal, Pierre, The Dictionary of Classical Mythology, Wiley-Blackwell, 1996, .
 Tripp, Edward, Crowell's Handbook of Classical Mythology, Thomas Y. Crowell Co; First edition (June 1970). .

Nymphs
Cretan characters in Greek mythology
Hellenistic Anatolian deities
Ancient Greek religion